Jüri Järvet (18 June 1919 – 5 July 1995) was an Estonian actor. His name sometimes appears as Yuri Yevgenyevich Yarvet, an incorrect back-transliteration from the Russian transliteration Юри Евгеньевич Ярвет. His birthname was Georgi Kuznetsov, and he took the Estonian form in 1938.

Biography
Järvet's mother was a Russian, while his father was believed to have been an ethnic German that immigrated from Lorraine.

Järvet is best known in the West for the role of Dr. Snaut in Andrei Tarkovsky's Solaris, but he played in numerous other films both in Russian and his native Estonian. He was awarded the title of People's Artist of the USSR in 1975, and the USSR State Prize in 1981.

Järvet played the title role in King Lear (1971) filmed on bleak landscapes in his native Estonia by Russian director Grigori Kozintsev and released in 1970. Kozintsev shared the screenwriting credit with Boris Pasternak; the score was by Dmitri Shostakovich.

His son Jüri Järvet Jr. has also acted in several movies, including All My Lenins and Khrustalyov, My Car!.

Filmography

 Andruse õnn (1955)
 Kutsumata külalised (1959) - Valter
 Laulu sõber (1961) - Ott Kuu
 Ühe katuse all (1963) - Tõnis
 Jäljed (1963) - Elmar
 Põrgupõhja uus Vanapagan (1964) - Peetrus
 Mäeküla piimamees (1965) - Tõnu Prillup
 Tütarlaps mustas (1967) - Juonas
 Viini postmark (1968) - Martin Roll
 Myortvyy sezon (1968) - Professor O'Reilly
 Hullumeelsus (1969) - Windisch
 Viimne reliikvia (1969) - Brother Johannes's voice (Estonian version)
 King Lear (1970) - King Lear
 Tuuline rand (1971) - Hollmann
 Tuulevaikus (1971) - Saare Sander
 Antsyali ardzaganqnere (1971) - Zeifert
 Metskapten (1971) - Jõnn
 Solyaris (1972) - Doktor Snaut, kibernetik
 Komitet 19-ti (1972) - Techer
 Ukuaru (1973) - Minna's Father
 Tavatu lugu (1974) - Psychiatrist
 Ohtlikud mängud (1974) - Õline
 Avariya (1974) - Judge
 Punane viiul (1975) - Peek
 Indrek (1976) - Teacher of religion
 Suvi (1976) - Toots's father
 Aeg elada, aeg armastada (1977) - Minister
 Karikakramäng (1977) - Oskar (segment "Salakütt")
 Data Tutashkhia (1977, TV Series) - Count Seged
 Dead Mountaineer's Hotel (1979) - Alex Snewahr
 Metskannikesed (1980) - Apothecary Lipp
 Skazka, rasskazannaya nochyu (1981) - Waldmännchen
 Nipernaadi (1983) - Siimon Vaa
 Lurich (1984) - Advokaat
 Litsom k litsu (1987)
 Tants aurukatla ümber (1987, TV Movie)
 Khronika Satany mladshego (1989) - Father Peter
 Surmatants (1991) - Tallinna linnapea
 Rahu tänav (1991) - Jaak
 Vremya vashey zhizni (1992)
 On svoyo poluchit (1992) - Demoney
 Luukas (1992) - Albert
 Lza ksiecia ciemnosci (1993) - Old compositor
 Marraskuun harmaa valo (1993) - Vanha mies
 Tallinn pimeduses (1993) - Anton

References

External links

1919 births
1995 deaths
Estonian male film actors
Male actors from Tallinn
People's Artists of the USSR
Soviet male film actors
Estonian people of Russian descent
Estonian people of German descent
Estonian people of French descent
Recipients of the USSR State Prize
Burials at Metsakalmistu